This is a list of episodes of In Bed with Medinner episodes in broadcast order (where known), from series 4.

1998 British television seasons